The Dub’l Duck is a bolt action, competition shooting pistol, designed and built by Ray Schwahn.  Only 15 Dub’l Ducks were ever made.  Ray Schwahn built the first Dub’l Duck in 1982, for himself for competition shooting.  The remaining 14 pistols were built by request from other competition shooters.  This weapon is primarily intended for metallic silhouette shooting; it is most easily fired from the Creedmoor shooting position.

All Dub’l Ducks are a conversion of the Remington Arms XP-100, made to fire a different round.  Two were chambered for the 7mm-08 Remington cartridges.  The remaining 13 were chambered for .300 Savage cartridges, necked down to fit 7mm international bullets.  With the exception of the unfinished 15th, each Dub’l Duck's stock was custom fitted to the owner's hand grip.  The 15th Dub’l Duck was never completed and still has the Remington XP-100 stock.

Single-shot pistols